The 1931 PGA Championship was the 14th PGA Championship, held September 14–19 at Wannamoisett Country Club in Rumford, Rhode Island, northeast of Providence. Then a match play championship, Tom Creavy, age 20, defeated Gene Sarazen 5 & 3 in the semifinals and Denny Shute 2 & 1 in the finals.

This was the first year the defending champion was exempt from qualifying; Tommy Armour lost in the quarterfinals to Shute,   Sarazen was the medalist in the qualifying with 145 (+5).

Through 2016, Sarazen remains the youngest winner of a modern major title at age 20 (in 1922) and Creavy was just 2 months older. Finalist Shute won consecutive titles in 1936 and 1937.

Format
The match play format at the PGA Championship in 1931 called for 12 rounds (216 holes) in six days:
 Monday – 36-hole stroke play qualifier
defending champion Tommy Armour and top 31 professionals advanced to match play
 Tuesday – first round – 36 holes 
 Wednesday – second round – 36 holes 
 Thursday – quarterfinals – 36 holes 
 Friday – semifinals – 36 holes 
 Saturday – final – 36 holes

Past champions in the field

Final results
Saturday, September 19, 1931

Final eight bracket

Final match scorecards
Morning

Afternoon

Source:

References

External links
PGA Media Guide 2012
PGA.com – 1931 PGA Championship

PGA Championship
Golf in Rhode Island
East Providence, Rhode Island
PGA Championship
PGA Championship
PGA Championship